Oscar Ward (born 15 October 1927) was an Indian boxer. He competed in the men's light heavyweight event at the 1952 Summer Olympics.

References

External links
 

1927 births
Possibly living people
People from Jabalpur
Anglo-Indian people
Indian male boxers
Olympic boxers of India
Boxers at the 1952 Summer Olympics
Place of birth missing
Light-heavyweight boxers